Thacher Montessori School is an independent, day school located in Milton, Massachusetts for toddlers through 8th graders. Thacher Montessori is accredited by the Association of Independent Schools of New England.

History 
Thacher Montessori School was founded in 1971 in a single classroom by Maureen Coughlan.  Her vision for a school dedicated to true Montessori principles resulted in steady growth. With support from her diverse and committed community of families and a growing student population, Thacher moved into its current home at 1425 Blue Hill Avenue in 1989.  The building was designed to be a Montessori learning environment with easy access to the outdoors, plenty of natural light and a floor plan well-suited for children. In spring 2008, Thacher began construction to add a second floor to the building. This project was completed in fall 2008.

In 2008, Thacher attained a classic Montessori structure of four Children's House, three Lower Elementary, two Upper Elementary and one Adolescent Program classrooms. A toddler program was also added.

External links 
 Thacher Montessori School web site

Educational institutions established in 1971
Schools in Norfolk County, Massachusetts
Private elementary schools in Massachusetts
Private middle schools in Massachusetts